Class M: Music is a classification used by the Library of Congress Classification system. This article outlines the subclasses of Class M.

M - Printed Music 
1-1.A15 ......  Music printed or copied in manuscript in the United States or the colonies before 1860
1.A5-3.3 .....  Collections
5-1480 ........  Instrumental music
1490 ...........  Music printed or copied in manuscript before 1700
1495-2199 ..  Vocal music
5000 ........... Unidentified compositions

ML - Literature on music 
1-5 ................. Periodicals. Serials
12-21 ............. Directories. Almanacs
25-28 ............. Societies and other organizations
29-31 ............. Special collections
32-33 ............. Institutions
35-38 ............. Festivals. Congresses
40-44 ............. Programs
45 .................. Circulars and advertisements
46 .................. Scrapbooks
47-54.8 .......... Librettos. Texts. Scenarios
55-89 ............. Aspects of the field of music as a whole
93-96.5 .......... Manuscript studies and manuscripts
100-109 ......... Dictionaries. Encyclopedias
110-111.5 ....... Music librarianship
112-112.5 ....... Music printing and publishing
112.8-158.8 .... Bibliography
159-3785 ........ History and criticism
3790-3792 ...... Music trade
3795 ............... Music as a profession. Vocational guidance
3797-3799.5 ... Musical research
3800-3923 ...... Philosophical and societal aspects of music. Physics and acoustics of music. Physiological aspects of music
3928-3930 ...... Literature for children

MT - Musical instruction and study 
1 ............. General works
2.5 .......... Music study abroad
3-5 .......... History
5.5-7 ....... Music theory
9-15 ........ Printed pedagogical aids
17 ........... Music in special education
18 ........... Music in colleges and universities
20-34 ...... Systems and methods
35-39 ...... Notation
40-67 ...... Composition. Elements and techniques of music
68 ........... Improvisation. Accompaniment. Transposition
70-74 ...... Instrumentation and orchestration
75 ........... Interpretation
80 ........... Embellishment
82 ........... Memorizing
85 ........... Conducting. Score reading and playing
87 ........... Community music
88 ........... Administration and instruction of vocal groups
90-146 .... Analysis and appreciation of musical works
150 ......... Audio-visual aids
155.......... Music theory for children
165 ......... Tuning
170-810 .. Instrumental techniques
820-915 .. Singing and vocal technique
918-948 .. School music
950 ......... Music to accompany instruction in ballet, folk dancing, gymnastics, etc.
955-956 .. Musical theater
960 ......... Music in the theater

References

Further reading 
 Full schedule of all LCC Classifications
 List of all LCC Classification Outlines
 Marcello Sorce Keller, "The Problem of Classification in Folksong Research: a Short History", Folklore,  XCV(1984), no. 1, 100-104.
 Mark McKnight, "Music Classification Systems" (Music Library Association Basic Manual Series, no. 1), Lanham, Maryland: Scarecrow Press, 2002.

M